John Hatton (25 February 1858 – 15 April 1915) was an English cricketer.  Hatton's batting style is unknown, though it is known he fielded as a wicket-keeper.  He was born at West Dean, Gloucestershire.

Hatton made his first-class debut for Gloucestershire against Yorkshire in 1884.  He made two further first-class appearances for Gloucestershire in that season, against Sussex and Yorkshire.  In his three first-class appearances for Gloucestershire, he scored a total of 28 runs, which came at an average of 5.60, with a high score of 11 not out.

He died at Gloucester, Gloucestershire on 15 April 1915.

References

External links
John Hatton at ESPNcricinfo
John Hatton at CricketArchive

1858 births
1915 deaths
People from Forest of Dean District
English cricketers
Gloucestershire cricketers
Sportspeople from Gloucestershire
Wicket-keepers